John Dooling may refer to:
 John Francis Dooling Jr., American judge
 John Thomas Dooling, assistant district attorney for New York City